Kaapo Taavetti Murros (29 July 1875 – 17 March 1951; name until 1895 Gabriel David Ahlqvist) was a Finnish journalist, lawyer, writer, and politician. He was a member of the Parliament of Finland from 1910 to 1913, representing the Social Democratic Party of Finland (SDP).

Murros was born in Tampere. In 1902, he had to leave Finland after he had protested against illegal conscription. He emigrated to the United States, and he returned to Finland in 1906.

References

1875 births
1951 deaths
Politicians from Tampere
People from Häme Province (Grand Duchy of Finland)
Social Democratic Party of Finland politicians
Members of the Parliament of Finland (1910–11)
Members of the Parliament of Finland (1911–13)
Finnish writers
Writers from Pirkanmaa
Finnish journalists
20th-century Finnish lawyers
University of Helsinki alumni
Finnish emigrants to the United States (1809–1917)